Giacomo Filippo Maraldi (21 August 1665 – 1 December 1729) was a French-Italian astronomer and mathematician. His name is also given as Jacques Philippe Maraldi.
Born in Perinaldo (modern Liguria) he was the nephew of Giovanni Cassini, and worked most of his life at the Paris Observatory (1687 – 1718). He also is the uncle of Jean-Dominique Maraldi.

From 1700 until 1718 he worked on a catalog of fixed stars, and from 1672 until 1719 he studied Mars extensively.
His most famous astronomical discovery was that the ice caps on Mars are not exactly on the rotational poles of that body. He also recognized (in May 1724) that the corona visible during a solar eclipse belongs to the Sun not to the Moon, and he discovered R Hydrae as a variable star. He also helped with the survey based on the Paris Meridian.

In 1723 he also confirmed earlier (1715) discovery of his pupil Joseph-Nicolas Delisle of what is usually referred to as Poisson's spot, an observation that was unrecognized until its rediscovery in the early 19th century by Dominique Arago.  At the time of Arago's discovery, Poisson's spot gave convincing evidence for the contested wave nature of light.

In mathematics he is most known for obtaining the angle in the rhombic dodecahedron shape in 1712, which is still called the Maraldi angle. 

Craters on the Moon and Mars were named in his and his nephew's honor.

References

External links
History of Mars Observations
Short biography

1665 births
1729 deaths
People from the Province of Imperia
Members of the French Academy of Sciences
18th-century French astronomers
17th-century Italian astronomers